The enzyme uracil-5-carboxylate decarboxylase catalyzes the chemical reaction

uracil 5-carboxylate  uracil + CO2

This enzyme belongs to the family of lyases, specifically the carboxy-lyases, which cleave carbon-carbon bonds.  The systematic name of this enzyme class is uracil-5-carboxylate carboxy-lyase (uracil-forming). Other names in common use include uracil-5-carboxylic acid decarboxylase, and uracil-5-carboxylate carboxy-lyase.

References

 

EC 4.1.1
Enzymes of unknown structure